UKBB may refer to:

 University Children's Hospital Basel, an independent, university-based centre of competence for paediatric and juvenile medicine
 UKBB, the ICAO code for Boryspil International Airport, Kyiv, Ukraine